Julie Halard was the defending champion but did not compete that year.

Ruxandra Dragomir won in the final 6–2, 3–6, 6–4 against Patty Schnyder.

Seeds
A champion seed is indicated in bold text while text in italics indicates the round in which that seed was eliminated.

  Barbara Paulus (second round)
  Karina Habšudová (second round)
  Helena Suková (first round)
  Katarína Studeníková (semifinals)
  Ruxandra Dragomir (champion)
 n/a
  Sabine Hack (second round)
  Silvia Farina (first round)
  Henrieta Nagyová (quarterfinals)

Draw

External links
 1996 Pupp Czech Open Draws

Singles
1996 Pupp Czech Open